Johann Paul Auer (1636–1687) was a German painter. Born in Nuremberg, he studied from 1654 to 1658 under Georg Christoph Eimmart at Ratisbon. In 1660 he went to Venice, and there received instructions from Pietro Liberi. He then went to Rome, where he stayed upwards of four years, and thence through Turin and Lyons to Paris, and so home to Nuremberg in 1670. He died in 1687. Auer painted historical, landscape, and genre pictures, besides portraits of many famous individuals, for which he was very celebrated.

References
 

17th-century German painters
German male painters
1636 births
1687 deaths
Artists from Nuremberg